"Por amor" is a song by Thalía, released as the second single from her fifth album, Amor a la Mexicana (1997). In France this was the titular song of the album. Music videos have been released both for the original and the remix version (Primera Vez remix) which was released after the success of the album in European countries like Turkey and Greece.

The song also received radio airplay in Spain.

Music video
The video for "Por Amor" was released in two versions directed by Gustavo Garzon. The original and international (European) versions were first aired in late 1997. The remix of the song performed well in clubs and was included on the 2003 album Thalía's Hits Remixed.

Live Performances
Thalía performed the song on various notable tv shows all around the world, such as Sábado Gigante and Susana Giménez.

Releases

CD promo
"Por Amor" (album version)3:56

Official versions and remixes
"Por Amor" (album version)3:56
"Por Amor" (Primer Encuentro mix)3:54
"Por Amor" (Primer Abrazo mix)3:54
"Por Amor" (Primer Beso mix)3:55
"Por Amor" (Primera Vez mix)4:39
"Por Amor" (banda version)3:58

Charts

Year-end charts

Covers
 Argentinian actress Florencia Pena recorded a cover of the song for one of her shows.

References

External links

 

Thalía songs
1998 singles
Spanish-language songs
Songs written by Kike Santander

hu:Por amor
pt:Por amor (canção de Thalía)